Alfred Görnemann (1 September 1877 – 11 October 1903) was a German cyclist who had his best achievements in motor-paced racing. He started training in this discipline only in 1901, after completing his military service, but quickly became a top competitor. The same year he won a bronze medal at the UCI Motor-paced World Championships and became a champion next year in the amateurs division. In 1903 he turned professional and won another bronze medal.

On 11 October 1903 during a 100 km race in Dresden, while trying to overcome his rival Thaddäus Robl, he collided with his pacer, sustaining a spinal injury and skull fracture. He died the same evening and was buried on 15 October 1903 in Berlin.

References

1877 births
1903 deaths
German male cyclists
Cyclists from Berlin
Sport deaths in Germany
Cyclists who died while racing